John Manfield Ridgway  (born 8 July 1938) is a British yachtsman and rower.

Biography
Ridgway was educated at the Pangbourne Nautical College and the Royal Military Academy Sandhurst. In 1966, whilst a Captain in the Parachute Regiment, Ridgway, together with Chay Blyth, rowed across the North Atlantic in a 20 ft open dory called English Rose III. They successfully completed this in 92 days as second team after George Harbo and Frank Samuelsen in 1896. In 1967 Ridgway and Blyth were awarded the Medal of the Order of the British Empire for Meritorious Service for their trip which was still considered impossible then.

In 1964 he married Marie Christine d’Albiac, daughter of Air Marshal Sir John d'Albiac.

He entered the Sunday Times Golden Globe Race in 1968 with his sloop English Rose IV, in an attempt to become the first person to sail single-handed non-stop around the world, but retired from the race in Recife, Brazil. In 1969 he founded the John Ridgway School of Adventure at Ardmore, Sutherland, Scotland. It is now managed by his daughter, Rebecca. In 1977–78 Ridgway raced his yacht Debenhams in the Whitbread Round the World Race.

In 1983/4 Ridgway and Andy Briggs sailed the school's 57-foot ketch, English Rose VI, in a non-stop passage round the world, setting (what was then) a 203-day record. In 1987 he awarded the Mungo Park Medal of the Royal Scottish Geographical Society. In 2003/4 Ridgway circumnavigated the globe in English Rose VI, in a campaign under the flag of the UN Environment Programme to highlight the plight of albatrosses.

He served with the Special Air Service (SAS).

Bibliography
 A Fighting Chance. with Chay Blyth, Pan Books / Readers Book Club, 1966, .
 Journey to Ardmore. Hodder & Stoughton Ltd, 1971, .
 Cockleshell Journey: The adventures of three men and a girl. Travel Book Club, 1975, .
 Storm Passage: A Winter's Voyage to the Sun. Quality Book Club, 1977, .
 Round the World with John Ridgway. with Marie C. Ridgway, William Heinemann Ltd, 1978, .
 Round the World Non-Stop. with Andrew Briggs, Round the World Non-Stop, 1985, .
 Road to Osambre. 1986, .
 Flood Tide. Hodder & Stoughton, 1989, .
 Then We Sailed Away. with Marie C. Ridgway and Rebecca Ridgway, Little Brown, 1996, .

References

External links
John and Marie Christine Ridgway biographies
Save The Albatross campaign site

English male rowers
English male sailors (sport)
Ocean rowers
Single-handed sailors
British Parachute Regiment officers
1938 births
Living people
People educated at Pangbourne College
Graduates of the Royal Military Academy Sandhurst
Members of the Order of the British Empire
Volvo Ocean Race sailors